Diana Paton,  (born 1969) is a British historian and academic. She specialises in the history of the Caribbean, including slavery, crime and punishment, gender history, and religion. Since 2016, she has been William Robertson Professor of History at the University of Edinburgh. She previously worked at The Queen's College, Oxford and Newcastle University, where she rose to be Professor of Caribbean History before moving to Edinburgh.

Education
Paton studied at Warwick University (BA) and Yale University (PhD). Her doctoral thesis was submitted in 1999, and was titled "No bond but the law: punishment and justice in Jamaica's age of emancipation, 1780-1870".

Academic career
Paton began her academic career as a junior research fellow at The Queen's College, Oxford. In 2000, she joined Newcastle University as a lecturer. She was promoted to Reader in Caribbean History in 2008, and to Professor of Caribbean History in 2015. In July 2016, she moved to the University of Edinburgh where she had been appointed to the William Robertson Chair of History.

She is an elected Fellow of the Royal Historical Society (FRHistS).

Selected works

References

Living people
21st-century British historians
British women historians
Historians of the Caribbean
Academics of the University of Edinburgh
Fellows of The Queen's College, Oxford
Academics of Newcastle University
1969 births
Fellows of the Royal Historical Society
Alumni of the University of Warwick
Yale University alumni
Gender studies academics